Erdafitinib, sold under the brand name Balversa, is an anti-cancer medication. It is a small molecule inhibitor of fibroblast growth factor receptor (FGFR) used for the treatment of cancer. FGFRs are a subset of tyrosine kinases which are unregulated in some tumors and influence tumor cell differentiation, proliferation, angiogenesis, and cell survival. Astex Pharmaceuticals discovered the drug and licensed it to Janssen Pharmaceuticals for further development.

Researchers have investigated erdafitinib for safety and efficacy in treatment of bile duct cancer, gastric cancer, non-small cell lung cancer, and esophageal cancer.

In March 2018, erdafitinib was granted breakthrough therapy designation by the U.S. Food and Drug Administration (FDA) for treatment of urothelial cancer.

In April 2019, erdafitinib was granted approval by the FDA for treatment of metastatic or locally advanced bladder cancer with an FGFR3 or FGFR2 alteration that has progressed beyond traditional platinum-based therapies, subject to a confirmatory trial. The U.S. Food and Drug Administration (FDA) considers it to be a first-in-class medication.

Side effects
Common side effects include increased phosphate level, mouth sores, feeling tired, change in kidney function, diarrhea, dry mouth, nails separating from the bed or poor formation of the nail, change in liver function, low salt (sodium) levels, decreased appetite, change in sense of taste, low red blood cells (anemia), dry skin, dry eyes and hair loss. Other side effects include redness, swelling, peeling or tenderness on the hands or feet (hand foot syndrome), constipation, stomach pain, nausea and muscle pain.

Erdafitinib may cause serious eye problems, including inflamed eyes, inflamed cornea (front part of the eye) and disorders of the retina, an internal part of the eye. Patients are advised to have eye examinations intermittently and to tell their health care professional right away if they develop blurred vision, loss of vision or other visual changes.

History
The efficacy of erdafitinib was studied in a clinical trial (NCT02365597) that included 87 adults with locally advanced or metastatic bladder cancer, with FGFR3 or FGFR2 genetic alterations, that had progressed following treatment with chemotherapy. The overall response rate in these adults was 32.2%, with 2.3% having a complete response and almost 30% having a partial response. The response lasted for an average of approximately five-and-a-half months. The trial was conducted in Asia, Europe, and the United States.

Erdafitinib received an accelerated approval. Further clinical trials are required to confirm erdafitinib's clinical benefit and the sponsor is conducting or plans to conduct these studies. Erdafitinib was also granted breakthrough therapy designation.

The FDA granted the approval of Balversa to Janssen Pharmaceutical. The FDA also approved the therascreen FGFR RGQ RT-PCR Kit, developed by Qiagen Manchester, Ltd., for use as a companion diagnostic with erdafinitib for this therapeutic indication.

References

External links 
 

Breakthrough therapy
Experimental cancer drugs
Protein kinase inhibitors
Johnson & Johnson brands
Pyrazoles
Quinoxalines